= Winter, Fifth Avenue =

Photograph by Alfred Stieglitz

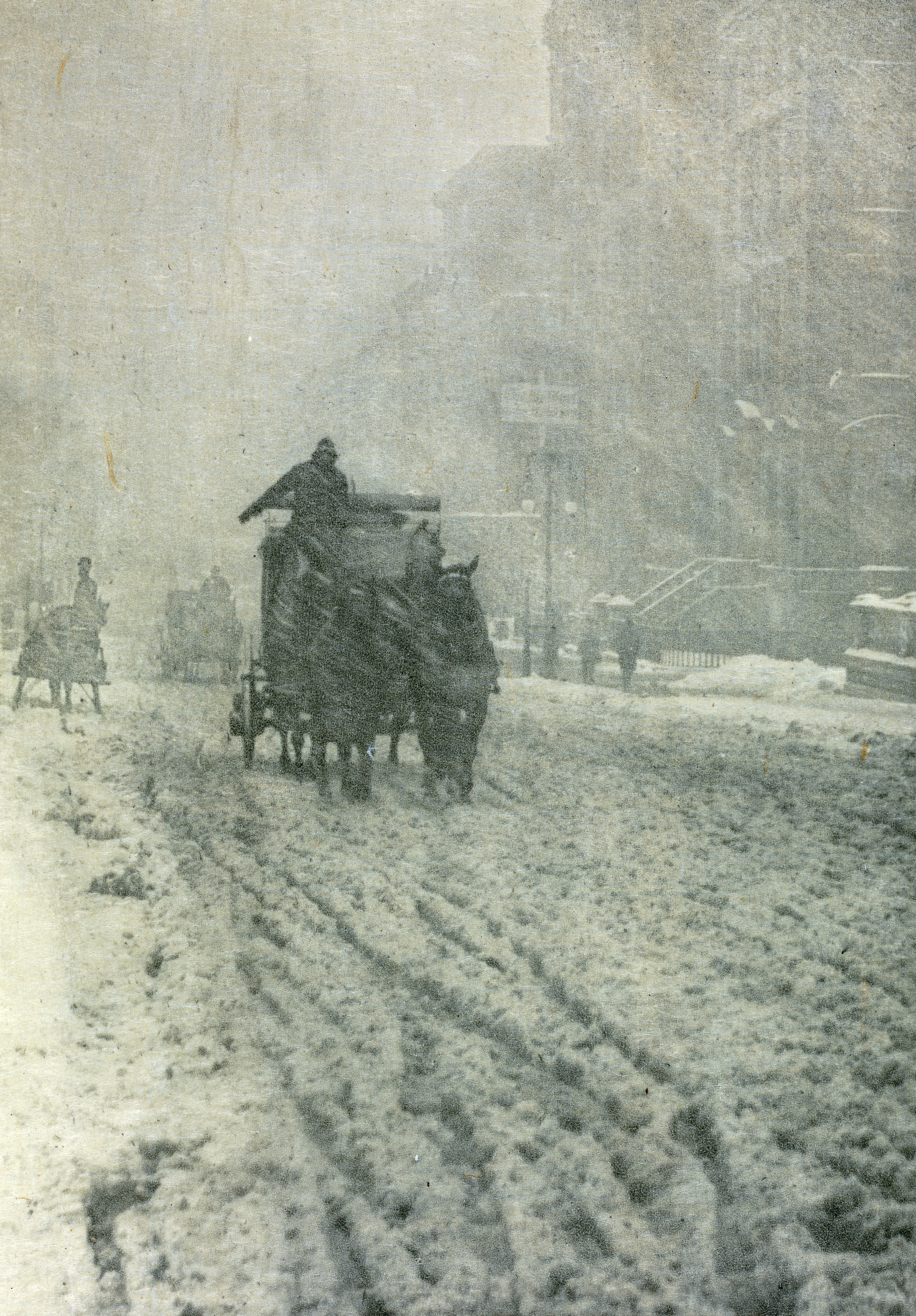
Winter – Fifth Avenue (1893) by Alfred Stieglitz

Winter, Fifth Avenue is a black and white photograph taken by Alfred Stieglitz in 1893. The photograph was made at the corner of Fifth Avenue and Thirty-Fifth Street in New York City. It depicts a horse-drawn omnibus pushing through a fierce blizzard and is considered one of the most significant early works in Stieglitz's career and a landmark image in the history of American photography. The photograph became the centerpiece of Stieglitz's 1897 article "The Hand Camera—Its Present Importance," and was exhibited and published at least twenty-five times before 1900.

== Background and creation ==
Stieglitz made the photograph after borrowing a hand camera from a fellow member of the Society of Amateur Photographers of New York, having conceived an idea for a picture that would have been nearly impossible to make with his cumbersome view camera in the raging blizzard. It was one of the first pictures Stieglitz took using a hand camera following his return from Europe, and he saw its creation as the beginning of a "new era" in his mature work.

With snow falling heavily and the wind blowing fiercely, he stood for three hours at the corner of Fifth Avenue and Thirty-Fifth Street, waiting for an opportunity to photograph a horse-drawn omnibus, its driver exposed to the elements, urging his horses steadily forward against the howling wind.

Stieglitz later wrote about the process of the photograph's creation:

In order to obtain pictures by means of the hand camera it is well to choose your subject, regardless of figures, and carefully study the lines and lighting. After having determined upon these watch the passing figures and await the moment in which everything is in balance; that is, satisfies your eye. This often means hours of patient waiting. My picture, 'Fifth Avenue, Winter,' is the result of a three hours' stand during a fierce snow-storm on February 22nd, 1893, awaiting the proper moment. My patience was duly rewarded. Of course, the result contained an element of chance, as I might have stood there for hours without succeeding in getting the desired picture.

The picture was later wrongly dated by the author as having been taken on 22 February 1892, but it only could have been made the following year, on 22 February 1893, judging by the weather descriptions of both days.

== Description and artistic style ==
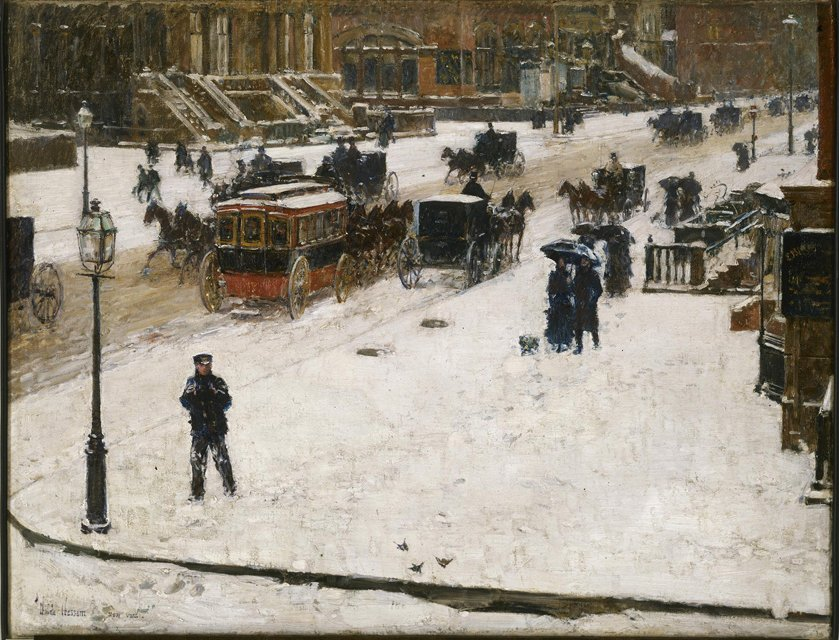
Frederick Childe Hassam, Fifth Avenue in Winter, c. 1892, oil on canvas, Carnegie Museum of Art, Pittsburgh. Yochelson notes that Stieglitz's winter Fifth Avenue works bear comparison to Hassam's painting of the same subject.

A horse-drawn stagecoach moves through Fifth Avenue during a blizzard, its figures and buildings nearly swallowed by swirling snow. The blurring effect of the snow lends the image an impressionistic atmosphere, transforming what might have been a straightforward street document into something closer to a mood study. Rather than simply recording the scene, Stieglitz presents New York through the lens of what scholars have called "picturesque" effects: misty atmosphere, snow-covered streets, and the movement of the carriage through the frame work together to evoke feeling rather than fact.

This atmospheric quality was central to his artistic vision. As he wrote in an 1892 essay, "atmosphere is the medium through which we see all things," a principle that shapes how weather, light, and urban space combine to give the photograph both its composition and its meaning. Stieglitz further explained that atmosphere "softens all lines; it graduates the transition from light to shade; it is essential to the reproduction of the sense of distance."

Stieglitz's photograph has also been compared to Childe Hassam's painting Fifth Avenue in Winter (1892), which depicts the street similarly in wintry conditions and reflects the shared "picturesque" artistic tradition that both artists drew from in representing New York.

== Technical process and exhibition ==
Once he had his shot, Stieglitz rushed back to develop the negative. One of his fellow members in the Society of Amateur Photographers of New York thought the image was so badly blurred that he should throw it away, but Stieglitz's primary concern was not with microscopic sharpness, which he considered of no pictorial value. His aim was instead to capture the feeling: the inward experience rather than merely the outward appearance of the scene. He considered the picture a symbolic self-portrait, feeling that the driver struggling up Fifth Avenue against the blasts of a great storm represented his own plight as an artist in a philistine city.

Within twenty-four hours of developing the negative, Stieglitz cropped it on all four sides, eliminating distracting figures on the left and right, and creating the impression that the viewer was positioned closer to the approaching stagecoach. To further enhance the atmospheric effect, he printed the image on rough-textured watercolor paper using the carbon print process.

The photograph was affirmed by critics as a technically remarkable achievement. In 1898, critic Sadakichi Hartmann praised Winter, Fifth Avenue as "a realistic expression of an everyday occurrence of metropolitan life," and suggested that if Stieglitz intended to discover the picturesqueness of New York City, "he will gain himself a place in our art life which the future art historians cannot overlook."

== Public collections ==
There are prints of the picture at the National Gallery of Art, Washington, D.C., the Metropolitan Museum of Art, New York, the Museum of Modern Art, New York, The Minneapolis Institute of Arts, among other collections.
